Results of the 1914 Swedish general election may refer to:

 Results of the March 1914 Swedish general election
 Results of the September 1914 Swedish general election